Hugo James Logan (born 21 September 1998) is an English former professional footballer who has previously played as a midfielder for Grand Canyon Antelopes.

Club career

Milton Keynes Dons 
Logan joined Milton Keynes Dons' academy at the age of 10. Following graduation from the academy, Logan signed professional terms alongside fellow graduate Sam Nombe on 12 May 2017. On 5 June 2017, Logan was named in the League Football Education's 'The 11' for June 2017, a list highlighting the achievements of young professionals in the game.

Logan made his full professional debut for the club on 29 August 2017, featuring as a substitute in a 2–0 home win against Brighton & Hove Albion U21s in an EFL Trophy group stage fixture. During the same season, Logan went on to feature twice more in the same competition versus Stevenage and Oxford United.

On 12 February 2018, Logan joined Southern Football League Premier Division club Hitchin Town on loan for the remainder of the 2017–18 season. Following the conclusion of the season, Logan was one of several players released by Milton Keynes Dons, ending a ten-year association with the club.

United States 
In 2019, Logan moved to the United States to pursue a graphic design degree at Grand Canyon University. Whilst at the university, Logan began playing college soccer for the Grand Canyon Antelopes.

International career 
In August 2013, Logan was called up to the England U17 national team alongside club teammate Giorgio Rasulo. On 5 August 2013, Logan made his debut for the U17 national side in a 0–1 away friendly victory over Faroe Islands U17.

Career statistics

References 

Living people
1998 births
English footballers
Footballers from Hertfordshire
Association football midfielders
Milton Keynes Dons F.C. players
English Football League players
Grand Canyon Antelopes men's soccer players
People educated at The Knights Templar School, Baldock
English expatriate footballers
English expatriate sportspeople in the United States
Expatriate soccer players in the United States
Grand Canyon University alumni